M Huncho is a British rapper and singer from London. He performed a Mad About Bars online freestyle session in 2017, and releasing his first EP Get Out that October, with the single "Mediocre" and another EP, 48 Hours, following in 2018. 2019 debut studio mixtape 'Utopia' has been streamed over 77 million times globally, and reached number 13 in the UK Albums Chart. His second mixtape, Huncholini the 1st, was released in January 2020 and peaked at number 5 in the UK. M Huncho has also worked with Nafe Smallz, Yxng Bane, Headie One, Yung Bleu, Dutchavelli and Unknown T.

Discography

Studio albums

Mixtapes

Collaborative mixtapes

Extended plays

Singles

As lead artist

As featured artist

Other charted and certified songs

Filmography

References

External links

Living people
1993 births
Rappers from London
British trap musicians
21st-century British rappers
Island Records artists
Masked musicians